Johanna Elizabeth Solís Sánchez (born 8 May 1991), known as Johanna Solís, is an Ecuadorian former footballer who played as a forward. She has been a member of the Ecuador women's national team.

International career
Solís capped for Ecuador at senior level during the 2010 South American Women's Football Championship.

References

1991 births
Living people
Women's association football forwards
Ecuadorian women's footballers
Sportspeople from Guayaquil
Ecuador women's international footballers
21st-century Ecuadorian women